An Hyok-il (born 10 January 1991) is a North Korean footballer. He represented North Korea on at least one occasion in 2008.

Career statistics

International

References

1991 births
Living people
North Korean footballers
North Korea international footballers
Association football midfielders
Pyongyang Sports Club players